The 1992 Major League Baseball season was the 111th season in the history of the Pittsburgh Pirates and their 106th in the National League. This was their 23rd season at Three Rivers Stadium. For the third consecutive season, the Pirates won the National League East Division Title with a record of 96–66. They were defeated four games to three by the Atlanta Braves in the 1992 National League Championship Series. The Pirates would not have another winning season or postseason berth again until 2013, and have not won a division title since.

Offseason
 November 11, 1991: Al Martin was signed as a free agent by the Pirates.
 January 3, 1992: Mike LaValliere was signed as a free agent by the Pirates.
 March 10, 1992: Neal Heaton was traded by the Pirates to the Kansas City Royals for Kirk Gibson.
 March 11, 1992: Dennis Lamp was signed as a free agent by the Pirates.
 March 17, 1992: John Smiley was traded by the Pirates to the Minnesota Twins for Denny Neagle and Midre Cummings.

Regular season

Season standings

Game log

|- style="background:#cfc;"
| 1 || April 6 || Expos || 2–0 || Drabek || Martinez || Mason || 48,800 || 1–0
|- style="background:#cfc;"
| 2 || April 8 || Expos || 4–2 || Smith || Gardner || Belinda || 7,075 || 2–0
|- style="background:#fbb;"
| 3 || April 9 || Expos || 3–8 || Nabholz || Walk || — || 10,342 || 2–1
|- style="background:#cfc;"
| 4 || April 10 || @ Phillies || 3–2 || Tomlin || Abbott || Belinda || 21,019 || 3–1
|- style="background:#fbb;"
| 5 || April 11 || @ Phillies || 4–7 || Ashby || Drabek || — || 24,967 || 3–2
|- style="background:#cfc;"
| 6 || April 12 || @ Phillies || 6–1 || Smith || Mulholland || — || 32,624 || 4–2
|- style="background:#cfc;"
| 7 || April 14 || Cubs || 3–2 || Walk || Jackson || Mason || 14,963 || 5–2
|- style="background:#cfc;"
| 8 || April 15 || Cubs || 7–2 || Tomlin || Morgan || — || 9,022 || 6–2
|- style="background:#cfc;"
| 9 || April 17 || Phillies || 7–4 || Drabek || Jones || Belinda || 16,417 || 7–2
|- style="background:#cfc;"
| 10 || April 18 || Phillies || 9–2 || Smith || Greene || — || 23,411 || 8–2
|- style="background:#cfc;"
| 11 || April 19 || Phillies || 11–0 || Patterson || Cox || — || 11,812 || 9–2
|- style="background:#cfc;"
| 12 || April 20 || @ Expos || 11–1 || Tomlin || Hill || — || 12,351 || 10–2
|- style="background:#cfc;"
| 13 || April 21 || @ Expos || 8–7 || Palacios || Haney || Mason || 7,013 || 11–2
|- style="background:#cfc;"
| 14 || April 22 || @ Expos || 2–0 || Drabek || Martinez || — || 8,421 || 12–2
|- style="background:#fbb;"
| 15 || April 23 || @ Expos || 3–6 || Gardner || Smith || Wetteland || 5,806 || 12–3
|- style="background:#cfc;"
| 16 || April 24 || @ Cubs || 3–2 || Mason || Scanlan || Belinda || 11,331 || 13–3
|- style="background:#cfc;"
| 17 || April 25 || @ Cubs || 1–0 || Tomlin || Maddux || Belinda || 26,892 || 14–3
|- style="background:#fbb;"
| 18 || April 26 || @ Cubs || 4–5 (10) || McElroy || Mason || — || 24,403 || 14–4
|- style="background:#fbb;"
| 19 || April 28 || @ Reds || 2–3 || Browning || Drabek || Charlton || 24,202 || 14–5
|- style="background:#cfc;"
| 20 || April 29 || @ Reds || 4–0 || Smith || Belcher || — || 20,307 || 15–5
|-

|- style="background:#fbb;"
| 21 || May 1 || @ Astros || 4–10 || Harnisch || Tomlin || — || 16,355 || 15–6
|- style="background:#cfc;"
| 22 || May 2 || @ Astros || 6–0 || Neagle || Bowen || — || 23,812 || 16–6
|- style="background:#fbb;"
| 23 || May 3 || @ Astros || 0–1 || Osuna || Mason || Jones || 8,739 || 16–7
|- style="background:#cfc;"
| 24 || May 4 || Reds || 12–5 || Lamp || Henry || — || 16,343 || 17–7
|- style="background:#cfc;"
| 25 || May 5 || Reds || 5–2 || Miller || Belcher || Belinda || 9,103 || 18–7
|- style="background:#cfc;"
| 26 || May 6 || Braves || 4–3 (16) || Patterson || Rivera || — || 18,686 || 19–7
|- style="background:#fbb;"
| 27 || May 7 || Braves || 2–4 || Glavine || Neagle || Stanton || 11,689 || 19–8
|- style="background:#cfc;"
| 28 || May 8 || Astros || 6–3 || Belinda || Osuna || — || 22,351 || 20–8
|- style="background:#cfc;"
| 29 || May 9 || Astros || 3–0 || Smith || Kile || — || 18,985 || 21–8
|- style="background:#fbb;"
| 30 || May 10 || Astros || 4–6 (10) || Jones || Mason || — || 21,154 || 21–9
|- style="background:#fbb;"
| 31 || May 12 || @ Braves || 2–4 || Glavine || Tomlin || Freeman || 38,949 || 21–10
|- style="background:#cfc;"
| 32 || May 13 || @ Braves || 11–10 || Belinda || Pena || — || 24,872 || 22–10
|- style="background:#cfc;"
| 33 || May 14 || @ Braves || 4–3 || Palacios || Smoltz || Mason || 32,303 || 23–10
|- style="background:#fbb;"
| 34 || May 15 || Padres || 2–9 || Lefferts || Neagle || — || 20,232 || 23–11
|- style="background:#fbb;"
| 35 || May 16 || Padres || 9–10 || Rodriguez || Walk || Myers || 34,474 || 23–12
|- style="background:#fbb;"
| 36 || May 17 || Padres || 5–6 || Benes || Tomlin || Myers || 16,580 || 23–13
|- style="background:#fbb;"
| 37 || May 19 || @ Giants || 2–7 || Wilson || Drabek || Righetti || 12,995 || 23–14
|- style="background:#fbb;"
| 38 || May 20 || @ Giants || 1–3 || Black || Smith || Brantley || 15,554 || 23–15
|- style="background:#fbb;"
| 39 || May 21 || @ Giants || 0–1 || Burkett || Walk || Jackson || 14,708 || 23–16
|- style="background:#cfc;"
| 40 || May 22 || @ Dodgers || 6–4 || Tomlin || Candiotti || — || 33,888 || 24–16
|- style="background:#fbb;"
| 41 || May 23 || @ Dodgers || 4–5 || Wilson || Belinda || — || 39,910 || 24–17
|- style="background:#fbb;"
| 42 || May 24 || @ Dodgers || 2–4 || Gross || Drabek || McDowell || 36,407 || 24–18
|- style="background:#fbb;"
| 43 || May 25 || @ Padres || 6–7 || Lefferts || Smith || Myers || 18,546 || 24–19
|- style="background:#fbb;"
| 44 || May 26 || @ Padres || 3–6 (10) || Scott || Lamp || — || 11,709 || 24–20
|- style="background:#fbb;"
| 45 || May 27 || @ Padres || 7–8 || Myers || Belinda || — || 16,338 || 24–21
|- style="background:#cfc;"
| 46 || May 29 || Giants || 13–3 || Palacios || Wilson || Patterson || 23,421 || 25–21
|- style="background:#cfc;"
| 47 || May 30 || Giants || 3–2 (10) || Neagle || Brantley || — || 10,266 || 26–21
|- style="background:#fbb;"
| 48 || May 31 || Giants || 3–5 || Black || Smith || Brantley || 29,451 || 26–22
|-

|- style="background:#fbb;"
| 49 || June 1 || Dodgers || 6–8 || Gott || Neagle || Candelaria || 12,346 || 26–23
|- style="background:#cfc;"
| 50 || June 2 || Dodgers || 1–0 || Tomlin || Candiotti || Mason || 18,644 || 27–23
|- style="background:#cfc;"
| 51 || June 3 || Dodgers || 6–5 || Gleaton || Martinez || Belinda || 11,736 || 28–23
|- style="background:#cfc;"
| 52 || June 4 || Mets || 7–2 || Drabek || Gooden || Patterson || 24,907 || 29–23
|- style="background:#cfc;"
| 53 || June 5 || Mets || 5–4 (10) || Belinda || Innis || — || 23,957 || 30–23
|- style="background:#fbb;"
| 54 || June 6 || Mets || 1–15 || Fernandez || Neagle || — || 32,138 || 30–24
|- style="background:#cfc;"
| 55 || June 7 || Mets || 3–0 || Tomlin || Schourek || — || 33,451 || 31–24
|- style="background:#fbb;"
| 56 || June 8 || @ Phillies || 0–7 || Schilling || Palacios || — || 21,040 || 31–25
|- style="background:#cfc;"
| 57 || June 9 || @ Phillies || 5–3 || Drabek || Hartley || Neagle || 29,138 || 32–25
|- style="background:#cfc;"
| 58 || June 10 || @ Phillies || 2–1 (12) || Patterson || Jones || Mason || 25,112 || 33–25
|- style="background:#cfc;"
| 59 || June 12 || @ Mets || 3–2 || Tomlin || Fernandez || Patterson || 38,976 || 34–25
|- style="background:#cfc;"
| 60 || June 13 || @ Mets || 3–2 || Robinson || Whitehurst || Belinda || 39,009 || 35–25
|- style="background:#cfc;"
| 61 || June 14 || @ Mets || 5–4 || Neagle || Innis || Belinda || 43,527 || 36–25
|- style="background:#fbb;"
| 62 || June 15 || Phillies || 1–4 || Mulholland || Smith || — || 23,581 || 36–26
|- style="background:#cfc;"
| 63 || June 16 || Phillies || 6–5 (12) || Patterson || Brantley || — || 18,548 || 37–26
|- style="background:#cfc;"
| 64 || June 17 || Phillies || 8–2 || Tomlin || Robinson || — || 24,854 || 38–26
|- style="background:#fbb;"
| 65 || June 18 || Expos || 0–4 || Nabholz || Palacios || Fassero || 20,512 || 38–27
|- style="background:#fbb;"
| 66 || June 19 || Expos || 1–2 || Hill || Drabek || Wetteland || 22,091 || 38–28
|- style="background:#fbb;"
| 67 || June 20 || Expos || 3–4 || Gardner || Smith || Wetteland || 31,614 || 38–29
|- style="background:#cfc;"
| 68 || June 21 || Expos || 5–4 || Robinson || Martinez || Belinda || 20,138 || 39–29
|- style="background:#cfc;"
| 69 || June 22 || Cardinals || 5–2 || Tomlin || Osborne || Walk || 20,831 || 40–29
|- style="background:#cfc;"
| 70 || June 23 || Cardinals || 6–4 || Mason || Worrell || Patterson || 11,408 || 41–29
|- style="background:#fbb;"
| 71 || June 24 || Cardinals || 1–4 || Tewksbury || Drabek || — || 22,096 || 41–30
|- style="background:#fbb;"
| 72 || June 26 || @ Expos || 2–6 || Martinez || Smith || Rojas || 23,014 || 41–31
|- style="background:#cfc;"
| 73 || June 27 || @ Expos || 12–4 || Robinson || Gardner || Belinda || 20,146 || 42–31
|- style="background:#fbb;"
| 74 || June 28 || @ Expos || 0–9 || Barnes || Tomlin || — || 24,793 || 42–32
|- style="background:#fbb;"
| 75 || June 29 || @ Cardinals || 1–3 || Tewksbury || Cole || — || 38,381 || 42–33
|- style="background:#cfc;"
| 76 || June 30 || @ Cardinals || 2–0 || Drabek || Cormier || — || 32,252 || 43–33
|-

|- style="background:#cfc;"
| 77 || July 1 || @ Cardinals || 1–0 || Smith || Clark || — || 40,042 || 44–33
|- style="background:#fbb;"
| 78 || July 2 || Reds || 1–2 || Rijo || Robinson || Charlton || 19,445 || 44–34
|- style="background:#fbb;"
| 79 || July 3 || Reds || 3–7 || Belcher || Tomlin || — || 29,870 || 44–35
|- style="background:#fbb;"
| 80 || July 4 || Reds || 2–5 || Swindell || Cole || — || 21,507 || 44–36
|- style="background:#fbb;"
| 81 || July 5 || Reds || 1–2 || Menendez || Drabek || Charlton || 24,369 || 44–37
|- style="background:#cfc;"
| 82 || July 6 || Astros || 1–0 || Smith || Jones || Belinda || 15,358 || 45–37
|- style="background:#cfc;"
| 83 || July 7 || Astros || 5–3 || Walk || Boever || — || 19,164 || 46–37
|- style="background:#fbb;"
| 84 || July 8 || Astros || 2–3 || Jones || Patterson || — || 22,551 || 46–38
|- style="background:#fbb;"
| 85 || July 9 || @ Reds || 2–5 || Bankhead || Mason || Charlton || 32,681 || 46–39
|- style="background:#cfc;"
| 86 || July 10 || @ Reds || 4–0 || Drabek || Hammond || — || 42,438 || 47–39
|- style="background:#cfc;"
| 87 || July 11 || @ Reds || 9–3 || Smith || Brown || — || 44,367 || 48–39
|- style="background:#cfc;"
| 88 || July 12 || @ Reds || 7–6 (10) || Patterson || Belcher || Belinda || 35,120 || 49–39
|- style="background:#cfc;"
| 89 || July 16 || Cubs || 2–1 || Drabek || Boskie || Belinda || 30,504 || 50–39
|- style="background:#fbb;"
| 90 || July 17 || Cubs || 1–2 || Maddux || Tomlin || Scanlan || 24,037 || 50–40
|- style="background:#cfc;"
| 91 || July 18 || Cubs || 4–0 || Walk || Morgan || Patterson || 32,908 || 51–40
|- style="background:#fbb;"
| 92 || July 19 || Cubs || 2–4 || Scanlan || Neagle || — || 32,304 || 51–41
|- style="background:#fbb;"
| 93 || July 20 || @ Astros || 8–11 || Blair || Mason || Jones || 12,112 || 51–42
|- style="background:#fbb;"
| 94 || July 21 || @ Astros || 3–4 (12) || Jones || Mason || — || 13,836 || 51–43
|- style="background:#cfc;"
| 95 || July 22 || @ Astros || 10–7 (13) || Belinda || Blair || Patterson || 13,194 || 52–43
|- style="background:#fbb;"
| 96 || July 24 || @ Braves || 3–4 || Glavine || Walk || Pena || 44,965 || 52–44
|- style="background:#fbb;"
| 97 || July 25 || @ Braves || 0–1 || Leibrandt || Jackson || Mercker || 44,567 || 52–45
|- style="background:#cfc;"
| 98 || July 26 || @ Braves || 5–4 || Belinda || Wohlers || — || 43,714 || 53–45
|- style="background:#fbb;"
| 99 || July 27 || @ Cubs || 2–3 || Maddux || Drabek || Robinson || 34,990 || 53–46
|- style="background:#fbb;"
| 100 || July 28 || @ Cubs || 1–11 || Morgan || Tomlin || — || 35,187 || 53–47
|- style="background:#fbb;"
| 101 || July 29 || @ Cubs || 4–6 (11) || Assenmacher || Belinda || — || 36,554 || 53–48
|- style="background:#cfc;"
| 102 || July 30 || Cardinals || 4–0 || Jackson || Clark || Patterson || 18,295 || 54–48
|- style="background:#cfc;"
| 103 || July 31 || Cardinals || 3–2 || Wakefield || DeLeon || — || 20,299 || 55–48
|-

|- style="background:#cfc;"
| 104 || August 1 || Cardinals || 4–1 || Drabek || Olivares || — || 30,577 || 56–48
|- style="background:#cfc;"
| 105 || August 2 || Cardinals || 2–1 || Walk || Smith || — || 28,309 || 57–48
|- style="background:#cfc;"
| 106 || August 4 || Mets || 3–2 (12) || Walk || Filer || — || 28,211 || 58–48
|- style="background:#cfc;"
| 107 || August 5 || Mets || 6–2 || Wakefield || Schourek || — || 30,009 || 59–48
|- style="background:#cfc;"
| 108 || August 6 || @ Cardinals || 3–2 (13) || Mason || Smith || Neagle || 32,001 || 60–48
|- style="background:#cfc;"
| 109 || August 7 || @ Cardinals || 5–1 || Tomlin || Cormier || — || 37,518 || 61–48
|- style="background:#cfc;"
| 110 || August 8 || @ Cardinals || 2–1 || Walk || Tewksbury || Belinda || 44,094 || 62–48
|- style="background:#cfc;"
| 111 || August 9 || @ Cardinals || 7–5 || Mason || Clark || Walk || 40,444 || 63–48
|- style="background:#cfc;"
| 112 || August 10 || @ Mets || 4–2 (16) || Cooke || Guetterman || — || 25,387 || 64–48
|- style="background:#fbb;"
| 113 || August 11 || @ Mets || 0–2 || Hillman || Drabek || Franco || 20,488 || 64–49
|- style="background:#cfc;"
| 114 || August 12 || @ Mets || 7–6 (10) || Neagle || Franco || Patterson || 29,559 || 65–49
|- style="background:#fbb;"
| 115 || August 14 || Braves || 0–15 || Glavine || Smith || — || 38,595 || 65–50
|- style="background:#fbb;"
| 116 || August 15 || Braves || 5–7 || Avery || Jackson || Pena || 38,808 || 65–51
|- style="background:#cfc;"
| 117 || August 16 || Braves || 4–2 || Wakefield || Smoltz || — || 35,199 || 66–51
|- style="background:#fbb;"
| 118 || August 17 || Braves || 4–5 (10) || Freeman || Patterson || Pena || 38,062 || 66–52
|- style="background:#cfc;"
| 119 || August 18 || Padres || 5–1 || Tomlin || Benes || — || 21,453 || 67–52
|- style="background:#cfc;"
| 120 || August 19 || Padres || 3–2 || Walk || Deshaies || Cox || 34,696 || 68–52
|- style="background:#cfc;"
| 121 || August 20 || Padres || 7–1 || Jackson || Lefferts || — || 30,384 || 69–52
|- style="background:#fbb;"
| 122 || August 21 || @ Giants || 5–6 || Burkett || Wakefield || Beck || 16,767 || 69–53
|- style="background:#cfc;"
| 123 || August 22 || @ Giants || 9–2 || Drabek || Oliveras || — || 30,568 || 70–53
|- style="background:#fbb;"
| 124 || August 23 || @ Giants || 2–5 || Black || Tomlin || — || 32,129 || 70–54
|- style="background:#fbb;"
| 125 || August 24 || @ Dodgers || 4–5 || Gott || Neagle || Candelaria || 21,991 || 70–55
|- style="background:#cfc;"
| 126 || August 25 || @ Dodgers || 10–3 || Cox || Martinez || — || 24,170 || 71–55
|- style="background:#cfc;"
| 127 || August 26 || @ Dodgers || 2–0 || Wakefield || Candiotti || — || 25,006 || 72–55
|- style="background:#fbb;"
| 128 || August 28 || @ Padres || 6–11 || Maddux || Drabek || — || 15,916 || 72–56
|- style="background:#cfc;"
| 129 || August 29 || @ Padres || 3–2 || Tomlin || Harris || Mason || 24,965 || 73–56
|- style="background:#cfc;"
| 130 || August 30 || @ Padres || 6–3 || Walk || Deshaies || — || 18,617 || 74–56
|-

|- style="background:#cfc;"
| 131 || September 1 || Giants || 5–3 || Jackson || Burkett || Mason || 20,930 || 75–56
|- style="background:#cfc;"
| 132 || September 2 || Giants || 3–2 || Wakefield || Black || Patterson || 13,099 || 76–56
|- style="background:#cfc;"
| 133 || September 3 || Giants || 9–3 || Drabek || Brantley || — || 9,057 || 77–56
|- style="background:#cfc;"
| 134 || September 4 || Dodgers || 6–5 || Patterson || Gott || — || 30,341 || 78–56
|- style="background:#cfc;"
| 135 || September 5 || Dodgers || 6–1 || Walk || Hershiser || — || 41,420 || 79–56
|- style="background:#fbb;"
| 136 || September 6 || Dodgers || 5–7 || Candiotti || Cox || Howell || 20,362 || 79–57
|- style="background:#fbb;"
| 137 || September 7 || Cubs || 5–6 (11) || Assenmacher || Belinda || Scanlan || 21,663 || 79–58
|- style="background:#cfc;"
| 138 || September 8 || Cubs || 5–2 || Drabek || Boskie || — || 7,720 || 80–58
|- style="background:#cfc;"
| 139 || September 9 || Cubs || 13–8 || Cox || Robinson || — || 10,853 || 81–58
|- style="background:#fbb;"
| 140 || September 11 || @ Phillies || 2–5 || Rivera || Walk || Williams || 20,168 || 81–59
|- style="background:#cfc;"
| 141 || September 12 || @ Phillies || 9–7 || Belinda || Williams || — || 22,857 || 82–59
|- style="background:#fbb;"
| 142 || September 13 || @ Phillies || 3–6 || Mulholland || Patterson || — || 35,842 || 82–60
|- style="background:#cfc;"
| 143 || September 14 || @ Cardinals || 5–4 (10) || Drabek || Smith || Belinda || 19,470 || 83–60
|- style="background:#cfc;"
| 144 || September 15 || @ Cardinals || 4–2 || Wagner || Clark || Cox || 20,992 || 84–60
|- style="background:#fbb;"
| 145 || September 16 || Expos || 3–6 || Nabholz || Walk || Wetteland || 37,436 || 84–61
|- style="background:#cfc;"
| 146 || September 17 || Expos || 3–2 (13) || Cox || Bottenfield || — || 20,802 || 85–61
|- style="background:#cfc;"
| 147 || September 18 || Phillies || 5–2 (6) || Wakefield || Mulholland || — || 20,387 || 86–61
|- style="background:#cfc;"
| 148 || September 19 || Phillies || 3–0 || Drabek || Greene || — || 25,497 || 87–61
|- style="background:#cfc;"
| 149 || September 20 || Phillies || 3–2 (13) || Mason || Shepherd || — || 21,652 || 88–61
|- style="background:#cfc;"
| 150 || September 21 || Cardinals || 3–0 || Cooke || Magrane || — || 13,345 || 89–61
|- style="background:#fbb;"
| 151 || September 22 || Cardinals || 4–5 || Cormier || Jackson || Smith || 8,222 || 89–62
|- style="background:#fbb;"
| 152 || September 23 || @ Expos || 1–5 (14) || Fassero || Mason || — || 30,552 || 89–63
|- style="background:#cfc;"
| 153 || September 24 || @ Expos || 9–3 || Drabek || Krueger || — || 33,493 || 90–63
|- style="background:#cfc;"
| 154 || September 25 || Mets || 3–2 || Tomlin || Fernandez || Cox || 22,291 || 91–63
|- style="background:#cfc;"
| 155 || September 26 || Mets || 19–2 || Walk || Hillman || — || 25,886 || 92–63
|- style="background:#cfc;"
| 156 || September 27 || Mets || 4–2 || Jackson || Schourek || Belinda || 31,217 || 93–63
|- style="background:#cfc;"
| 157 || September 28 || @ Cubs || 10–3 || Wakefield || Bullinger || — || 9,603 || 94–63
|- style="background:#cfc;"
| 158 || September 29 || @ Cubs || 3–0 || Wagner || Castillo || Belinda || 18,759 || 95–63
|- style="background:#fbb;"
| 159 || September 30 || @ Cubs || 0–6 || Maddux || Tomlin || — || 11,547 || 95–64
|-

|- style="background:#fbb;"
| 160 || October 2 || @ Mets || 3–6 || Schourek || Drabek || Jones || 10,183 || 95–65
|- style="background:#fbb;"
| 161 || October 3 || @ Mets || 1–2 || Gooden || Jackson || — || 13,549 || 95–66
|- style="background:#cfc;"
| 162 || October 4 || @ Mets || 2–0 || Wakefield || Saberhagen || Cooke || 14,274 || 96–66
|-

|-
| Legend:       = Win       = LossBold = Pirates team member

Record vs. opponents

Detailed records

Roster

Opening Day lineup

Player stats
Batting
Note: G = Games played; AB = At bats; H = Hits; Avg. = Batting average; HR = Home runs; RBI = Runs batted in

Pitching
Note: G = Games pitched; IP = Innings pitched; W = Wins; L = Losses; ERA = Earned run average; SO = Strikeouts

National League Championship Series

Game 1
October 6: Atlanta–Fulton County Stadium, Atlanta

Game 2
October 7: Atlanta–Fulton County Stadium, Atlanta

Game 3
October 9: Three Rivers Stadium, Pittsburgh, Pennsylvania

Game 4
October 10: Three Rivers Stadium, Pittsburgh, Pennsylvania

Game 5
October 11: Three Rivers Stadium, Pittsburgh, Pennsylvania

Game 6
October 13: Atlanta–Fulton County Stadium, Atlanta

Game 7
October 14: Atlanta–Fulton County Stadium, Atlanta

Awards and honors

Barry Bonds, OF, National League Most Valuable Player Award
Jim Leyland, National League Manager of the Year Award
Randy Tomlin, National League Pitcher of the Month, June
Tim Wakefield, National League Rookie Pitcher of the Year

1992 Major League Baseball All-Star Game
Andy Van Slyke, CF, starter
Barry Bonds, LF, starter

Notable transactions
 May 5, 1992: Kirk Gibson was released by the Pirates.
 June 10, 1992: Jeff Robinson was selected off waivers by the Pirates from the Texas Rangers.
 June 11, 1992: Dennis Lamp was released by the Pirates.
 June 19, 1992: Danny Cox was signed as a free agent by the Pirates.
 July 4, 1992: Tony Mitchell (minors) was traded by the Pirates to the Cleveland Indians for Alex Cole.
 July 25, 1992: Jeff Robinson was released by the Pirates.
 July 31, 1992: Pitcher Tim Wakefield called up from AAA Buffalo.

Draft picks
 June 1, 1992: Jason Kendall was drafted by the Pirates in the 1st round (23rd pick) of the 1992 Major League Baseball Draft. Player signed June 16, 1992.
June 1, 1992: Chance Sanford was drafted by the Pittsburgh Pirates in the 27th round of the 1992 amateur draft. Player signed June 4, 1992.

Farm system

References

External links
 1992 Pittsburgh Pirates team page at Baseball Reference
 1992 Pittsburgh Pirates team page at www.baseball-almanac.com
 Remembrances of Tim Wakefield almost getting the Pirates to the World Series

Pittsburgh Pirates seasons
Pittsburgh Pirates Season, 1992
National League East champion seasons
Pittsburgh Pirates